This is a list of Swedish television related events from 2008.

Events
28 March - TV chef Tina Nordström and her partner Tobias Karlsson win the third season of Let's Dance.
May - 10-year-old singer Zara Larsson wins the second season of Talang.
12 December - Kevin Borg wins the fifth season of Idol.

Debuts

Television shows

2000s
Idol (2004-2011, 2013–present)
Let's Dance (2006–present)
Talang (2007-2011, 2014–present)
1–24 December - Skägget i brevlådan

Ending this year

Births

Deaths

See also
2008 in Sweden

References